John Derian is an American decoupage artist living in New York City.

John Derian's shop in the Lower East Side features artisans and collaborators such as Leanne Shapton, Benoît Astier de Villatte and Ivan Pericoli (owners of Astier de Villatte), Hugo Guinness, Natalie Lété, Livia Cetti, Crystal Sloane (Vintage by Crystal), and Stephanie Housley (founder of Coral & Tusk). Many of the decoupage plates, paperweights, bowls, and coasters are handmade in his studio in New York City. His pieces have been featured in numerous magazines, including Elle Decor and Vogue. Derian has created several collections in collaboration with Target, most recently a Halloween-themed collection made available in October 2020.

References 

Living people
Artists from New York City
Year of birth missing (living people)